José Luis Rodríguez Peralta (born 5 November 1922, date of death unknown) was a Mexican footballer. He competed in the men's tournament at the 1948 Summer Olympics.

References

External links
 
 

1922 births
Year of death missing
Mexican footballers
Mexico international footballers
Olympic footballers of Mexico
Footballers at the 1948 Summer Olympics
Association football defenders
C.F. Monterrey players